Bernard B. Fall (November 19, 1926 – February 21, 1967) was a prominent war correspondent, historian, political scientist, and expert on Indochina during the 1950s and 1960s. Born in Austria, he moved with his family to France as a child after the Anschluss. He started fighting for the French Resistance at the age of 16 and later for the French Army during World War II.

In 1950, he first came to the United States for graduate studies at Syracuse University and Johns Hopkins University, returning and making his residence there. He taught at Howard University for most of his career and made regular trips to Southeast Asia to learn about changes and their societies. He predicted the failures of France and the United States in their wars in Vietnam because of their tactics and lack of understanding of the societies. He was killed by a landmine in South Vietnam while he was accompanying US Marines on a patrol in 1967.

Early life
Bernard Fall was born in Vienna, Austria, to the Jewish parents Leo Fall and Anna Seligman. His family migrated in 1938, when he was 12, to live in France after the Anschluss, the annexation of Austria by Nazi Germany. After France fell to Germany in 1940, his father aided the French Resistance and was captured, tortured, and killed by the Gestapo. His mother was also captured and deported and was never heard from again.

In 1942, at the age of 16, Bernard Fall followed in his father's footsteps and joined the French Resistance after which he fought the Germans in the Alps. As France was being liberated in 1944, Fall joined the French Army in which he served until 1946. For his service, he was awarded the French Liberation Medal. After World War II, Fall worked as an analyst for the Nuremberg War Crimes Tribunal in which capacity he investigated Krupp Industries.

Academic career
Fall studied at the University of Paris from 1948 to 1949 and attended from 1949 to 1950 the University of Munich.

After completing his studies in Europe, Fall traveled to the United States in 1950 on a Fulbright Scholarship. He studied at the University of Maryland for a time. In 1951, Fall enrolled at Syracuse University, where he received a master's degree in political science in 1952 and a PhD in 1955.

Fall did postgraduate study at the Johns Hopkins School for Advanced International Studies, where he was encouraged by one of his professors, Amry Vandenbosch, to study Indochina because of his French background.
 
Not content to study Indochina from afar, Fall traveled to Vietnam in 1953, while the First Indochina War was being waged between the Viet Minh and the French Union forces. His French citizenship allowed Fall to accompany French soldiers and pilots into enemy territory. From his observations, Fall predicted that the French would fail in Vietnam. When the French were defeated at the critical Battle of Dien Bien Phu, Fall claimed that the United States had been partly responsible for France's loss. Fall believed that the Americans had not sufficiently supported France during the war. 

In 1954, Fall returned to the United States and married Dorothy Winer, a 1952 graduate of Syracuse University, and submitted his dissertation, Viet-Minh Regime: Government and Administration in the Democratic Republic of Vietnam. In 1955, he became an assistant professor at American University in Washington, DC.

In 1956, he began teaching international relations courses at Howard University, also in Washington, DC. Fall became a full professor at Howard in 1962 and taught there intermittently until his death.

Never losing his interest in Indochina, Fall returned to the region five more times (in 1957, 1962, 1965, 1966, and 1967) to study developments firsthand. Fall was given a grant by the Southeast Asia Treaty Organization to study the development of communism in Southeast Asia. He used documented the rise of communist activity in Laos. Fall was particularly interested in the tensions between North Vietnam and South Vietnam. While teaching at the Royal Institute of Administration in Cambodia in 1962, Fall was invited to interview Ho Chi Minh and Phạm Văn Đồng in Hanoi. Ho Chi Minh told Fall of his belief that communism would prevail in South Vietnam in about a decade's time.

Fall was a political scientist but had been a soldier and so spoke the soldier's language and shared soldiers' lives at the frontline. He obtained his data on the war while he slogged through the mud of Vietnam with French colonial troops, American infantrymen, and ARVN soldiers. He combined academic analysis of Indochina with a infantry|grunt's perspective of the war.

Vietnam War
Fall supported the American military presence in South Vietnam, believing it could stop the country from falling to communism, but he strongly criticized Ngo Dinh Diem's American-backed regime and the tactics used by the United States military in Vietnam. As the conflict between the American forces and the communists in Vietnam escalated throughout the 1960s, Fall became increasingly pessimistic about the Americans' chances of success. He predicted that if it did not learn from France's mistakes, it too would fail in Vietnam. Fall wrote extensive articles detailing his analysis of the situation in Vietnam and lectured a great deal about his ideas on the Vietnam War. Fall's research was considered invaluable by many American diplomats and military officials, but his negative opinions were often not taken seriously. By 1964, Fall concluded that the American forces in Vietnam were losing. Fall's dire predictions caught the attention of the Federal Bureau of Investigation (FBI), which began to monitor his activities.

Many have noted Fall's accuracy and comprehension in his writing about the Vietnam War. In Colin Powell's 1995 autobiography, My American Journey, he wrote:

Noam Chomsky has called Fall "the most respected analyst and commentator on the Vietnam War."

Death

Towards the end of his life, Fall suffered from retroperitoneal fibrosis, which resulted in the loss of a kidney and a colon blockage. According to his wife, his condition engendered a sense of fatalism as he departed for what turned out to be his final trip to Vietnam. On 21 February 1967, while accompanying a company of the 1st Battalion 9th Marines on Operation Chinook II in the Street Without Joy, Thừa Thiên Province, Fall stepped on a Bouncing Betty landmine, which killed both him and Gunnery Sergeant Byron G. Highland, a US Marine Corps combat photographer. He was dictating notes into a tape recorder, which captured his last words: "We've reached one of our phase lines after the firefight and it smells bad—meaning it's a little bit suspicious... Could be an amb—." Fall was survived by his wife and three daughters.

Legacy and honors
The medical library at the main civilian hospital in Da Nang was named The Bernard B. Fall Memorial Medical Library in his honor.

French Liberation Medal (1945)
Fulbright Scholar (1950)
United States Department of Defense Certificate of Appreciation (1961)
George Polk Award in Journalism (1966)
Guggenheim Fellowship for further research in Vietnam (1966)

Books by Bernard Fall

 Viet-Nam Witness, 1953-66 (1966)

 The Viet-Minh Regime (1954)
 Ho Chi Minh on Revolution; Selected Writings 1920-66. Editor. Prager, 1967.

Books about Bernard Fall

Research on Bernard Fall 

Moir, Nathaniel L. (2022). Number One Realist: Bernard Fall and Vietnamese Revolutionary Warfare. Oxford University Press.

See also
 List of journalists killed and missing in the Vietnam War
 Autrefois, Maison Privée

References

External links
Website for biography, Bernard Fall: Memories of a Soldier-Scholar, includes first chapter ("The Last Departure") and 48 photographs 

https://web.archive.org/web/20061028050540/http://www.truthdig.com/interview/item/200601003_the_un_quiet_frenchman/ "The unquiet Frenchman"], an interview with Dorothy Winer Fall by Sarah Stillman, October 6, 2006

1926 births
1967 deaths
20th-century Austrian Jews
French Army personnel of World War II
People of the First Indochina War
People of the Vietnam War
Journalists killed while covering the Vietnam War
American University faculty and staff
French war correspondents
Landmine victims
French military historians
Historians of the Vietnam War
Jewish American historians
American male non-fiction writers
20th-century American historians
French male writers
French Resistance members